CD-23 was a C Type escort ship (Kaibōkan) of the Imperial Japanese Navy during the Second World War.

History
CD-23 was laid down by the Nihonkai Dock Company on 10 February 1944, launched on 20 May 1944, and completed and commissioned on 15 September 1944. During the war CD-23 was mostly busy on escort duties.

CD-23 was struck from the Navy List on 10 March 1945.

References

Additional sources
 
 
 

1944 ships
Ships built in Japan
Type C escort ships
Maritime incidents in January 1945
World War II shipwrecks in the Sea of Japan
Ships sunk by US aircraft